A point of difference is a factor of products or services that establishes differentiation. Differentiation is the way in which the goods or services of a company differ from its competitors. Indicators of the point of difference's success would be increased customer benefit and brand loyalty. However, an excessive degree of differentiation could cause the goods or services to lose their standard within a given industry, leading to a subsequent loss of consumers. Hence, a balance of differentiation and association is required, and a point of parity has to be adopted in order to allow a business to remain or further enhance its competitiveness.

Significance of differentiation

Standing out from the competitors
By differentiating itself from competitors, a business might have greater potential income. Because having differentiated goods or services limits the choices of consumers, which drive them to purchase goods or services from a particular company. In addition to that, the threats brought by competitors would be lowered significantly, which means, by adopting differentiation strategy, it would allow businesses to be more competitive and be able to have a greater source of income.

Effects on brand loyalty

As the choices of consumers would be lowered significantly from differentiation strategy, consumers are unlikely to accept other variations without being convinced. Which means, it drives the consumers to lean towards a particular company, and establish a better relationship with the company. Thus, businesses would be able to take advantage from brand loyalty and further enhance the competitiveness.

Point of difference vs. point of parity
Points of difference and points of parity are both utilized in the positioning of a brand for competitive advantage via brand/product.

Points-of-difference (PODs) – Attributes or benefits consumers strongly associate with a brand, positively evaluate and believe they could not find to the same extent with a competing brand i.e. points where you are claiming superiority or exclusiveness over other products in the category.

Points-of-parity (POPs) – Associations that are not necessarily unique to the brand but may be shared by other brands i.e. where you can at least match the competitors claimed best. While POPs may usually not be the reason to choose a brand, their absence can certainly be a reason to drop a brand.

While it is important to establish a POD, it is equally important to nullify the competition by matching them on the POP. As a late entrant into the market, many brands look at making the competitor's POD into a POP for the category and thereby create a leadership position by introducing a new POD.

POP refers to the way in which a company's product offers similarity with its competitors within an industry. It could also be known as the elements that are considered mandatory for a brand to be recognized as a legitimate competitor within a given industry.

As an excessive degree of differentiation would cause the goods or services losing its standard, but not having differentiation would not benefit businesses as well. Therefore, in order to avoid excessive differentiation, adopting point of parity would be the solution. In terms of offering similarities, businesses should look at the benefits and all the positive features of the competitor's product, and take advantage from it. At the same time, businesses could work on the negative aspects or even further enhance the positive features of the particular product in order to achieve differentiation, and to take advantage from it. Therefore, finding a balance between point of difference and point of parity is a critical factor for businesses to succeed.

Kevin Keller and Alice Tybout note there are three types of difference: brand performance associations; brand imagery associations; and consumer insight associations. The last only comes into play when the others are at parity. Insight alone is a weak point of difference, easily copied. Putting these together, check their desirability, deliverability and eliminate contradictions.

Traditionally, the people responsible for positioning brands have concentrated on the differences that set each brand apart from the competition. But emphasizing differences isn't enough to sustain a brand against competitors. Managers should also consider the frame of reference within which the brand works and the features the brand shares with other products.

Three questions about a brand can help:
Have we established a frame? A frame of reference signals to consumers the goal they can expect to achieve by using a brand. 
Are we leveraging our points of parity? Certain points of parity must be met if consumers are to perceive your product as a legitimate player within its frame of reference. 
Are the points of difference compelling? A distinguishing characteristic that consumers find both relevant and believable can become a strong, favourable, unique brand association, capable of distinguishing the brand from others in the same frame of reference.

Assessment
The assessment of consumer desirability criteria for PODs should be against:
Relevance
Distinctiveness
Deliverability

Whilst when assessing the deliverability criteria for PODs look at their:
Feasibility
Communicability
Sustainability

Differentiation types

Product differentiation
In order to achieve product differentiation, that particular product needs to have other unique features and stands out from its competing products, or that particular product becomes the only product that offers certain features to consumers by entering a new industry. Achieving product differentiation is one of the ways for businesses to become the market leader. However, if the product differentiation were too radical, it would lead to acceptance problems on the consumer side, because the product might not meet the expected standards, or it could be quickly obsolete. Products can be differentiated in form, features, performance quality, conformance quality, durability, reliability, repairability, style and customization.

Price differentiation
Price differentiation is where a business offers a different price (lower or higher) from the industry's standard or its competitors. By offering a lower price, it would attract consumers to purchase, as their demand is likely to be higher, when the price is lower. In terms of offering a higher price, it also has the effect of drawing the attention from consumers, as consumers would wonder the reason behind it, and higher price product tends to be more appealing to the upper class group. However, in order to take advantage from offering a higher price, the quality of the product has to match the price, otherwise, consumers would lose interests because of not getting what they pay for.

Differentiation focus
The principles of differentiation focus are similar to all the other differentiation strategies, where it differentiates some of the features from the competitors. However, differentiation focus targets a particular segment within a market, where it allows businesses to focus on their strength. Thus, the user experience of the particular segment would be better, as all the marketing and pre-production work of the goods or services are focused on specific segment.

Case studies
Apple's Mac OS System The Mac OS System is an example of a successful differentiation strategy. Mac OS offers a variety of features and advantages that Windows PC does not have. For example, MacBook does run faster in the SSD drives and flash storage through the use of PCIe connections, as opposed to the majority of PCs, where SATA is being used instead. Additionally, the Mac OS System has a better security against virus attack. Also, MacBooks come with software included, for example, iMovie, GarageBand and FaceTime, for a better user experience. Apple is able to stand out from its competitors with its unique features through product differentiation strategy, as well as being able to take advantage from using premium-pricing strategy as their price differentiation.

Snapchat Snapchat, founded in 2011, was recognized in 2014, where 9% of the US smartphone owners use Snapchat. Developers Bobby Murphy and Evan Spiegel took advantage from the growing trend of the social media, and targeted people from the age of 13 to 34, as expressing feelings and thoughts through the social media is one of the biggest phenomenon of teenagers. It was a successful differentiation focus strategy implemented by Snapchat, as they focused on a particular segment instead of targeting people from every age group. By implementing differentiation focus strategy, it allowed Snapchat to focus on the features that people from the age of 13 – 34 prefer, and as a result, user experience would be enhanced, as the app is tailored for them. Thus, in 2014, Snapchat became the top three leading social media app.

Impact on businesses

Advantages and disadvantages of differentiation
Despite the significance of implementing differentiation strategy, differentiation itself has its advantages and disadvantages. In terms of advantages, one of the examples would be it enhances innovation, where new goods and services would draw public's attention, and allowing businesses to survive in the global competitive market, as differentiated products would stand out from other competitors and avoid the threats brought by substituted products. In addition, differentiation would allow businesses to take advantage from brand loyalty. It is because differentiated goods and services are likely to have a better user experience, hence, the chance of having returning customers would be significantly increased.

However, differentiation also contains disadvantages, an example would high cost and time consuming, especially in the introduction stage of the product life cycle. It is because R&D (research and development) and marketing would require certain amount of money and time in order to be accomplished properly. Apart from the concern over cost and time, another disadvantage would be differentiation hinders market entry. It is because successful differentiation would attract competitors to replicate, and once competitors implement price differentiation strategy, customers are likely to leave for a better offer in terms of the price. Therefore, in order to avoid all the threats, businesses would have to ensure marketing and branding have been well accomplished in order to take advantage from brand loyalty.

Short- and long-term effects

From a short-term point of view, differentiation strategy is less likely to favor businesses, as R&D (research and development) and marketing would require certain amount of money and time. Also, it takes time for differentiated products to gain recognition and be accepted by the public. Arguably, differentiated products are able to draw attention and spark people's interest, as they are newly introduced. 

On the other hand, from a long-term point of view, differentiation strategy is more likely to favor businesses. It is because once R&D and marketing are being done, businesses would be able to have a clearer picture regarding what do people prefer, then differentiation focus strategy can also be implemented. Furthermore, differentiated products are likely to be recognized, as people would discover and examine them, which means, the risk of not gaining recognition would be reduced, and businesses are able to take advantage from brand loyalty if the user experience is exceptional. On the flipside, it is also conceivable that successful differentiation would hinder new entry, i.e. the competition in a particular industry could become more competitive. Additionally, innovation is required in order to survive in the competitive global market, which means, it could be challenging for businesses to ensure their differentiated products are innovative and contemporary for people over a long period of time. Thus, even though the upside of differentiation strategy is more likely to outweigh the downside of differentiation strategy in the long-term, businesses also have to ensure its sustainability at the same time.

References

Product management
Uniqueness